Zoltán Kenesei (born 16 September 1972, in Hungary) is a Hungarian former professional footballer.

References
AEK Larnaca profile at EUFO
Zoltán Kenesei profile at Sportbasis
Cyprus Championship 2003–2004 at rsssf

1972 births
Living people
Hungarian footballers
Rákospalotai EAC footballers
Szombathelyi Haladás footballers
MTK Budapest FC players
FC Sopron players
Csepel SC footballers
Szeged LC footballers
KF Tirana players
FK Partizani Tirana players
AEK Larnaca FC players
Diósgyőri VTK players
Nyíregyháza Spartacus FC players
Liga Leumit players
Cypriot First Division players
Hungarian expatriate footballers
Expatriate footballers in Cyprus
Expatriate footballers in Albania
Expatriate footballers in Israel
Hungarian expatriate sportspeople in Cyprus
Hungarian expatriate sportspeople in Albania
Hungarian expatriate sportspeople in Israel
Association football midfielders
Footballers from Budapest